Barry Mugeli (born 19 March 1948) is a former Australian rules footballer who played for the Collingwood Football Club in the Victorian Football League (VFL).

Notes

External links 

1948 births
Australian rules footballers from Victoria (Australia)
Collingwood Football Club players
Living people